Dunărea Sports Hall is an indoor arena in Galați, Romania and is the home ground of basketball, handball and volleyball clubs from Galați. The arena holds 1,500 fans.

References

Sport in Galați
Indoor arenas in Romania
Buildings and structures in Galați County
Basketball venues in Romania